In the United Kingdom, football clubs sometimes choose to enter administration (sanction) when they are unable to pay off outstanding debts. Under the Insolvency Act 1986, a business will face a winding-up order bringing them to court and if it is shown that a business cannot pay debts as they fall due or cannot repay outstanding debts then the company will be classified as insolvent. Administration puts accountants "in charge of pretty much everything apart from coaching the players and picking the team". For a football club in administration, the "football creditors rule" requires football-related debts such as wages owed to players and staff, and transfer fees owed to other clubs to be paid first.

England and Wales
In 2000, ITV Digital bought the broadcasting rights to Football League and League Cup matches in a three-year, £315m deal. In March 2002, the company went bankrupt owing the League £180 million which it said it "cannot afford to pay". Because of this, many Football League clubs had financial problems and entered administration.

Before the implementation of a points deduction it was perceived that clubs had "manipulated and abused [administration] as a way of shedding debts then restructuring, and borrowing again once the hapless creditors had been fobbed off with their 8p in the pound". In September 2003, it was proposed that clubs entering administration would be docked 10 points. A 'fit and proper persons' test was also introduced in an attempt to prevent fraudulent activities. If a person was previously director at a club which was in "administration twice during a five-year period" or at "two different clubs that have each gone into administration in a five-year period" then they would be prevented from becoming the controlling shareholder of a Football League club. A 'fit and proper persons' test was also introduced for directors of Premier League clubs. In November 2009, Stephen Vaughan, Sr. became the first director to fail the 'fit and proper persons' test.

To ease financial problems for clubs that had been relegated, "parachute payments" were introduced to give time to adapt to the financial gulf between divisions. The deductions of 10 points in the Football League and 9 points in the Premier League were ratified in 2004, with the rule in place from the start of the 2004–05 season. The League also adopted rules that prevented any side from being in administration for either two successive seasons or eighteen consecutive months. The reason for the deduction being a point less in the Premier League was that the teams play eight fewer fixtures than Football League clubs. The first club to incur this new penalty were League One side Wrexham F.C. who entered administration on 3 December 2004.

Leeds United filed for administration with only a few days remaining in the 2006–07 season, which automatically triggered a 10-point penalty. This placed Leeds at the bottom of the table and relegated the club, but they were extremely likely to have been relegated anyway. By entering administration during the 2006–07 season, they hoped to avoid starting the 2007–08 season on −10 points. The following week, Boston United entered administration in the final minutes of a defeat to Wrexham which ensured they were relegated to the Football Conference, meaning they likewise avoided starting the following season on -10 points (though they would find themselves being double-relegated to the Conference North for unrelated reasons). The Football League saw both cases as clubs trying to exploit a loophole, and changed the rules. From 2007–08, any club entering administration after the fourth Thursday in March would have their 10-point deduction suspended until the following season. If the club is relegated the points will be deducted from their tally at the start of next season. If the club stays up the 10 points will be taken off their final total.

On 26 February 2010, Portsmouth became the first Premier League club to enter administration.

Football creditors rule
In a situation of insolvency, the "football creditors rule" means that debts to other clubs or players are prioritised and must be paid in full before the club is eligible to compete again in the league. The Enterprise Act 2002 made reforms to the insolvency act and, from 15 September 2003, the altered procedures for administration were implemented. Most notably it abolished the Crown's preferential right to recover unpaid taxes ahead of other creditors. As such, HM Revenue and Customs (HMRC) is now often not paid in full (between 2003 and 2010, outstanding unpaid taxes to the HMRC amounted to £30 million). This legality of the football creditors rule was challenged in 2004 in Inland Revenue Commissioners v The Wimbledon Football Club Ltd. However, it was found that "full payment to football creditors (out of third party funds) ahead of preferential creditors did not infringe the provisions of section s4(4)(a) of the Act" and "differential treatment may be necessary to secure the continuation of the company's business and may be regarded as supportable".

In 2011 HMRC brought another challenge to the football creditors rule in the High Court, this time on the basis that it breached fundamental principles of insolvency law, including the pari passu rule that all unsecured creditors should be paid on a proportionate basis. However, in May 2012 the court rejected the challenge as it found that the rule was not a deliberate evasion of insolvency law.

List of clubs in England and Wales that have entered administration or CVA

Company voluntary arrangement
Football clubs may also negotiate a Company voluntary arrangement (CVA). While not strictly the same as administration, the EFL regards a CVA as an insolvency event and imposes a 12-points deduction. Debts to football creditors also need to be settled in full, if league membership is to be retained. In July 2019, Bury owner Steve Dale agreed a CVA with creditors to avoid the club going into administration; the club were deducted 12 points ahead of the 2019–20 season, but Dale's failure to provide the EFL with full details of the CVA led to Bury's opening fixtures being suspended ahead of a possible expulsion from the League. On 27 August 2019, the EFL announced that Bury's membership of the league had been withdrawn. On 27 November 2020, Dale placed the club into administration.

Scotland
Following the adoption of a points sanction in the English Football League, a similar rule was proposed for adoption by the Scottish Premier League (SPL) in December 2003. It was announced in January 2004 that SPL clubs going into administration in the 2004–05 season would be subject to a 10-point deduction and be prevented from signing new players. With Motherwell and Dundee already in administration at the time, it was decided that if "they are not in the process of coming out of administration by 31 May", the deduction would be applied at the start of the following season. Furthermore, the Scottish Football Association would not allow clubs in administration to play in European competition. Both Motherwell and Dundee met the required conditions to avoid the deduction of points. The 10-point penalty was subsequently applied to Gretna in the 2007–08 season and Rangers in 2011–12.

Although the Scottish Football League (SFL) had no automatic deduction of points for clubs going into administration, it reserved the right to "deduct championship points before or during a season and/or to impose a player registration embargo on any club". This meant that its penalties for insolvency varied; Dundee were docked 25 points in the 2010–11 season because it was the second time they had entered administration in a relatively short period. The SFL also had the power to place a team in the bottom tier (Third Division) if there were any doubts that the club could fulfill their fixtures for the forthcoming season.

The administration and liquidation of The Rangers Football Club Plc prompted much discussion in Scotland about what sanctions (if any) are appropriate for an insolvent club. When Rangers entered administration in February 2012, the club was docked 10 points in the 2011–12 Scottish Premier League. The SPL clubs agreed to amend the penalty for administration to the greater of 10 points or one third of the club's tally in the previous season. Rangers attempted to agree a CVA with its creditors, but this offer was rejected by HMRC in June 2012. The business and assets of Rangers were instead sold to a new company. One of Rangers' assets was its membership of the SPL, but this could not be transferred without the approval of the other SPL clubs. Rangers' application for transfer was rejected by a 10–1 majority. The SPL attempted to negotiate a deal with the SFL whereby Rangers would enter the First Division (second tier). This was rejected by SFL clubs, who instead voted for Rangers to be granted associate membership of the SFL and a place in the Third Division (fourth tier).

When the SPL and SFL merged to form the Scottish Professional Football League (SPFL) in 2013, the penalty for entering administration was standardised as 15 points. Hearts entered administration days before the leagues merged and were docked 15 points for the 2013–14 season under the old SPL rules, as they had earned 44 points in the 2012–13 season.

List of clubs in Scotland that have entered administration

Clubs in other sports that have entered administration

Notes

References

External links
Football Clubs In Administration

Association football terminology
Laws of association football
History of association football
Insolvency